The men's triple jump event at the 2000 Summer Olympics as part of the athletics program was held at the Olympic Stadium. Forty athletes from 27 nations competed. The maximum number of athletes per nation had been set at 3 since the 1930 Olympic Congress. The triple jump has been ever present since the beginning of the modern Olympic Games in 1896. The event was won by Jonathan Edwards of Great Britain, the nation's first victory in the men's triple jump since 1908 (and only the second overall). Edwards became the 12th man to win two medals in the event, adding gold to his 1996 silver. Yoel García's silver put Cuba on the podium for the second Games in a row.

Background

This was the 24th appearance of the event, which is one of 12 athletics events to have been held at every Summer Olympics. The returning finalists from the 1996 Games were silver medalist Jonathan Edwards of Great Britain, bronze medalist Yoelbi Quesada of Cuba, fifth-place finisher Armen Martirosyan of Armenia, sixth-place finisher Brian Wellman of Bermuda (who had also made the final in 1992), and eighth-place finisher Robert Howard of the United States. Edwards (whose 1995 world record still stands in 2020) was the favorite, with Quesada (the 1997 world champion, over Edwards) also a strong contender. Charles Friedek of Germany, the 1999 world champion (Edwards had come in third) was present but injured.

No nations made their first appearance in the event, which had happened before only in 1904 (when the United States was the only nation to compete). The United States competed for the 23rd time, having missed only the boycotted 1980 Games.

Qualification

Each National Olympic Committee was permitted to enter up to three athletes that had jumped 16.85 metres or further during the qualification period. The maximum number of athletes per nation had been set at 3 since the 1930 Olympic Congress. If an NOC had no athletes that qualified under that standard, one athlete that had jumped 16.65 metres or further could be entered.

Competition format

The top twelve athletes from the three jumps in qualifying (and all who jumped 16.95 metres) progressed through to the final where the qualifying distances were scrapped and they started afresh with another three jumps. After these the top eight athletes carried their record forward and then had a further three attempts to decide the gold medalist.

Records

Prior to the competition, the existing world and Olympic records were as follows.

Schedule

All times are Australian Eastern Standard Time (UTC+10)

Results
All distances shown are in meters.

Qualifying 

Held on 23 September 2000.

The qualifying distance was 16.95m. For all qualifiers who did not achieve the standard, the remaining spaces in the final were filled by the longest jumps until a total of 12 qualifiers.

Final

References

External links
Official results, qualification - IAAF.org
Official results, final - IAAF.org

 Source: Official Report of the 2000 Sydney Summer Olympics available at https://web.archive.org/web/20080522105330/http://www.la84foundation.org/5va/reports_frmst.htm

Athletics at the 2000 Summer Olympics
Triple jump at the Olympics
Men's events at the 2000 Summer Olympics